Gindibu was a king of the Qedarite Arabs.

Reign

Background
Gindibu ruled over an Arab kingdom located around the Wādī Sirḥān. The kingdom of Gindibu bordered on the powerful kingdoms of Aram-Damascus and Israel in the west, although Gindibu himself was independent of Damascene hegemony.

Battle of Qarqar
Although Gindibu's kingdom was not on the Assyrian campaign routes and therefore was not in danger of being attacked by the Assyrians, the rise of Neo-Assyrian power in the 9th century BCE meant that the desert and border routes where Gindibu had economic interests were under threat of Assyrian interference, due to which he allied with his powerful neighbours, the kings Bar-Hadad II of Aram-Damascus and Ahab of Israel, against the Assyrian Empire. Fearing disruptions by the Assyrians, Gindibu led 1000 camelry troops at the battle of Battle of Qarqar in 853 BCE on the side of the alliance led by Aram-Damascus and Israel against Shalmaneser III of Assyria.

Aftermath
Shalmaneser III later campaigned to Damascus and Mount Ḥawrān in 841 BCE, but his inscriptions mentioned neither the Qedarite kingdom nor Gindibu himself or any successor of his. The Qedarites were not mentioned either in the list of rulers, including those of distant places such as Philistia, Edom, and Israel, who paid tribute to Adad-nirari III after the latter's defeat of Ben-Hadad III of Damascus in 796 BCE. This reason for absence the Assyrian records is that the kingdom of Gindibu was far from the campaign routes of the Assyrians during the later 9th century BCE.

References

Sources

 

Ancient Arabs
9th-century BC in Assyria
9th-century BC Arabs